Kevin Daniel Ríos Quintana (born January 24, 1993 in Rionegro, Antioquia) is a Colombian amateur track cyclist. He represented his nation Colombia, as a member of the men's national pursuit team, at the 2012 Summer Olympics, and also, claimed the men's junior trophy in road cycling at the 2011 Vuelta del Porvenir de Colombia.

Rios qualified for the Colombian squad in the men's team pursuit at the 2012 Summer Olympics in London based on the nation's selection process from the UCI Track World Rankings. He and his teammates Edwin Ávila, Arles Castro, and Weimar Roldán recorded an eighth-place time of 4:04.772 in the classification final match, losing only to the Dutch squad by more than two tenths of a second.

References

External links
NBC Olympics Profile

1993 births
Living people
Colombian male cyclists
Colombian track cyclists
Cyclists at the 2012 Summer Olympics
Olympic cyclists of Colombia
People from Rionegro
Sportspeople from Antioquia Department
20th-century Colombian people
21st-century Colombian people
Competitors at the 2014 Central American and Caribbean Games